Árpád Fazekas (born 20 July 1949) is a Romanian former international footballer who played as a midfielder.

Career
Born in Bahnea, Fazekas played for Chimica Târnăveni and ASA Târgu Mureș.

He earned three international caps for Romania, making his debut under coach Valentin Stănescu in a 1–1 against Greece at the 1973–76 Balkan Cup. Fazekas also appeared in two friendly games, a 2–2 against Turkey and a 4–2 defeat against Italy.

Honours
ASA Târgu Mureș
Divizia B: 1970–71

Notes

References

1949 births
Living people
Romanian footballers
Romania international footballers
ASA Târgu Mureș (1962) players
Liga I players
Liga II players
Association football midfielders
Romanian football managers